Sebastián Báez defeated Federico Coria in the final, 6–1, 3–6, 6–3 to win the singles tennis title at the 2023 Córdoba Open.

Albert Ramos Viñolas was the defending champion, but lost to Coria in the semifinals.

Seeds
The top four seeds received a bye into the second round.

Draw

Finals

Top half

Bottom half

Qualifying

Seeds

Qualifiers

Qualifying draw

First qualifier

Second qualifier

Third qualifier

Fourth qualifier

References

External links
 Main draw
 Qualifying draw

2023 Cordoba Open - 1
2023 ATP Tour
2023 in Argentine tennis